Pugu or Bogu was an ancient civilization or state of ancient China around the mouth of the Yellow River.

History
The Pugu are recorded as existing during the Shang and were counted among the "Eastern Barbarians" or Dongyi of Qingzhou. They occupied the shore of the Bay of Bohai around present-day Binzhou and Boxing, an area which the silt deposition from the present course of the Yellow River has since made miles inland.

In alliance with the Shang prince Wu Geng, Pugu joined the Dongyi of Yan (near present-day Qufu) and Xu in the Huai valley in opposing Shang's replacement by the Zhou after the Battle of Muye. This insurrection joined with the Rebellion of the Three Guards within Zhou itself, opposing the regency of the Duke of Zhou  BC. The Duke undertook a successful campaign across the North China Plain, defeating Wu Geng and forcing the submission of the opposing Yi. Pugu's area was granted to the minister Jiang Ziya as the fief of Qi.

The Bamboo Annals record that during the Duke of Zhou's expedition the "royal troops... attacked Yan and destroyed Pugu". The word used means "destroy" and even implies "extermination". This was, however, patently hyperbolic since "belligerents" required a combined response from Qi, Lu, and Zhou ten years later and the Pugu are again said to have been "destroyed" in the autumn three years after that.

During the reign of King Yi, Duke Hu moved the Qi capital to the former site of Pugu. This prompted the residents of the former capital Yingqiu to revolt under another member of his house, who defeated him in battle and restored the former capital.

Legacy
Its name survived as Putai and Putai County as late as the 20th century, although the former is now the subdistrict of Pucheng in Binzhou and the latter has merged with Boxing County.

See also
 Dongyi & Siyi
 Bamboo Annals

Notes

References

Citations

Bibliography
 .
 .
 . 
 .

Former countries in East Asia
Ancient Chinese states
Zhou dynasty
Shang dynasty
History of Shandong